Major General John Sheffield   (28 April 1910 – 30 July 1987) was a British army officer and hurdler. He competed in the men's 400 metres hurdles at the 1936 Summer Olympics.

References

1910 births
1987 deaths
Athletes (track and field) at the 1936 Summer Olympics
British Army generals
British male hurdlers
Companions of the Order of the Bath
Commanders of the Order of the British Empire
Olympic athletes of Great Britain
Place of birth missing